Run for Love is a 2016 Chinese romance anthology film directed by Zhang Yibai, Guan Hu, Zhang Meng, Teng Huatao, and Gao Qunshu, featuring five love stories respectively in Japan, United States, Norway, Turkey and Saipan. It was released in China on February 14, 2016.

Plot

Five different love stories pan out as five different couples run into something that will change their lives forever.

In “So Long, My Love,” Su Le Qi (Zhang Ziyi) arrives in Japan after reading about the country in her ex's letters. She meets apprentice chef Feng Yu Jian (Eddie Peng), who offers to show her around Hokkaido.

In “Homeward Journey,” couple Tang Jing (Liang Jing) and Zhou Hong Yi (Zhang Yi) are on a family tour in Turkey. While visiting Istanbul, they lose their five-year-old daughter in the gargantuan market of the Grand Bazaar. As they frantically search for their daughter, the true problems of their marriage come to light.

In “Nothing Like Romance,” Chicago resident Guan Yue (Wu Mo Chou) spends life with her American husband Lu Jie (Wang Qian Yuan), whom she married for a green card. When she finds out that she is on her last breaths, Guan Yue convinces Lu Hie to join her on a 2,300 mile drive along Route 66 to Los Angeles, on a journey that will forever change the couple.

In “Artificial Sunlight,” Nurse Lily (Michelle Chen) hasn't visited her homeland in five years. She accepts a nursing job at an old home in Rjukan, Norway. She also meets and develops feelings for local lawyer Andrews (Sebastian Stiger). When one of Lily's dying patients mentions that she just wants to see the sun in the perpetually dark Rjukan, Lily and Andrews decide to find a way to fulfill this final wish.

In “Stolen Heart,” actress Ye Lan (Tong Li Ya) lives in Saipan, a small island near Guam. She is repeatedly haunted by memories of a tragic event from her past. One day, she meets mysterious young woman named Bai Qie Zi (Zhou Dong Yu). Bai Qie Zi claims to know a lot about Ye Lan, and is more than a little interested in the actress. What follows is a blast from Ye Lan's past that she never expected.

Cast

Japan
Director: Zhang Yibai
Zhang Ziyi
Eddie Peng

Norway
Director: Teng Huatao
Michelle Chen
Sebastian Stigar
Per Christian Ellefsen
Janny Hoff Brekke
Sigmund Sæverud
Trond Halbo
Geir Tangen

Saipan
Director: Gao Qunshu
Zhou Dongyu
Tong Liya

United States
Director: Zhang Meng
Wang Qianyuan
Wu Mochou
Brian Rooney

Turkey
Director: Guan Hu
Liang Jing
Zhang Yi

See also
Cities in Love (2015), Chinese film with similar premise

References

External links

2010s romance films
Chinese romance films
Chinese anthology films
Films shot in Japan
Films set in Hokkaido
Films set in Istanbul
Films set in Norway
Films set in the United States
Films shot in Norway
Films shot in Turkey
Films shot in the United States
Films directed by Teng Huatao
Films directed by Zhang Meng
Films directed by Gao Qunshu
Japan in non-Japanese culture
Films directed by Guan Hu